Arthur Holland may refer to:

Arthur Holland (British Army officer) (1862–1927), British Conservative and Unionist Member of Parliament for Northampton
Arthur John Holland (1918–1989), mayor of Trenton, New Jersey
Bud Holland (Arthur A. Holland, died 1994), American aviator and B-52 pilot from Suffolk, Virginia
Arthur Holland (referee) (1916–1987), English football referee of the 1950s and '60s